Richard Kyle John Joyce  (born 30 July 1992) is a New Zealand field hockey player who plays as a goalkeeper for Belgian club Racing Club de Bruxelles and the New Zealand national team.

Personal life
Richard Joyce was born and raised in North Shore, New Zealand.

Club career
In the New Zealand National Hockey League, Joyce played for the North Harbour men's team. He joined Racing Club de Bruxelles in the Belgian Hockey League for the 2020–21 season.

International career

Under-21
Richard Joyce made his debut for the New Zealand under-21 team in 2012, at the Sultan of Johor Cup in Johor Bahru.

The following year in 2013, Joyce represented the team at the Junior World Cup in New Delhi. At the tournament, the team finished seventh.

Black Sticks
In 2014, Richard Joyce debuted for the New Zealand senior international team, the 'Black Sticks', during a test series against Japan in Wellington.

Joyce claimed his first major medal for New Zealand in 2017, winning silver at the Oceania Cup in Sydney.  He followed this up with silver medals at the 2018 Commonwealth Games on the Gold Coast, and again at the Oceania Cup in 2019 in Rockhampton.

References

External links
 
 
 
 

1992 births
Living people
People from North Shore, New Zealand
New Zealand male field hockey players
Male field hockey goalkeepers
Field hockey players at the 2018 Commonwealth Games
2018 Men's Hockey World Cup players
Commonwealth Games silver medallists for New Zealand
Commonwealth Games medallists in field hockey
Royal Racing Club Bruxelles players
Men's Belgian Hockey League players
20th-century New Zealand people
21st-century New Zealand people
Medallists at the 2018 Commonwealth Games